AP-3 complex subunit mu-1 is a protein that in humans is encoded by the AP3M1 gene.

The protein encoded by this gene is the medium subunit of AP-3, which is an adaptor-related protein complex associated with the Golgi region as well as more peripheral intracellular structures. AP-3 facilitates the budding of vesicles from the Golgi membrane and may be directly involved in protein sorting to the endosomal/lysosomal system. AP-3 is a heterotetrameric protein complex composed of two large subunits (delta and beta3), a medium subunit (mu3), and a small subunit (sigma 3). Mutations in one of the large subunits of AP-3 have been associated with the Hermansky-Pudlak syndrome, a genetic disorder characterized by defective lysosome-related organelles. Alternatively spliced transcript variants encoding the same protein have been observed.

References

External links

Further reading